The Pan American Wheelchair Handball Championship is the official competition for senior national Wheelchair handball teams of Pan America. It has two categories 7 versus 7 and 4 versus 4 players.

Tournaments

Results

Men's

Men's 7x7

Men's 4x4

Cat A

Cat B

Women's

Women's 7x7

Women's 4x4

Medal count

Men's

Women's

Total

References

 
Parasports competitions
Wheelchair handball
Recurring sporting events established in 2014
2014 establishments in South America